Allocosa is a spider genus of the wolf spider family, Lycosidae. The 130 or more recognized species are spread worldwide.

Species
, the World Spider Catalog accepted the following species:

Allocosa abmingani (Hickman, 1944) – South Australia
Allocosa absoluta (Gertsch, 1934) – USA, Mexico
Allocosa adolphifriederici (Strand, 1913) – Central, East Africa, Zanzibar
Allocosa albiconspersa Roewer, 1959 – Rwanda
Allocosa albonotata (Schmidt, 1895) – Russia
Allocosa algoensis (Pocock, 1900) – South Africa
Allocosa alticeps (Mello-Leitão, 1944) – Argentina
Allocosa apora (Gertsch, 1934) – USA to Costa Rica
Allocosa aurata (Purcell, 1903) – South Africa
Allocosa aurichelis Roewer, 1959 – South Africa
Allocosa bersabae Roewer, 1959 – Namibia
Allocosa biserialis Roewer, 1959 – Congo
Allocosa brasiliensis (Petrunkevitch, 1910) – Brazil
Allocosa caboverdensis Schmidt & Krause, 1995 – Cape Verde Is.
Allocosa calamarica (Strand, 1914) – Colombia
Allocosa cambridgei (Simon, 1876) – Turkey, Syria
Allocosa chamberlini (Gertsch, 1934) – USA
Allocosa clariventris (Guy, 1966) – Morocco
Allocosa comotti (Thorell, 1887) – Myanmar
Allocosa danneili (Dahl, 1908) – Bismarck Arch.
Allocosa delagoa Roewer, 1959 – Mozambique
Allocosa delesserti (Caporiacco, 1941) – Ethiopia
Allocosa deserticola (Simon, 1898) – Egypt
Allocosa dingosaeformis (Guy, 1966) – Morocco
Allocosa dubia (Walckenaer, 1837) – Brazil
Allocosa dufouri (Simon, 1876) – Portugal, Spain
Allocosa edeala Roewer, 1959 – Cameroon
Allocosa efficiens Roewer, 1959 – Congo, Rwanda
Allocosa excusor (L. Koch, 1867) – Queensland
Allocosa exserta Roewer, 1959 – Botswana, South Africa
Allocosa faberrima (Simon, 1910) – Namibia
Allocosa finkei (Hickman, 1944) – South Australia
Allocosa flavisternis (L. Koch, 1877) – Queensland, New South Wales
Allocosa floridiana (Chamberlin, 1908) – USA
Allocosa funerea (Hentz, 1844) (type species) – USA
Allocosa furtiva (Gertsch, 1934) – USA
Allocosa gabesia Roewer, 1959 – Tunisia
Allocosa glochidea Roewer, 1959 – Namibia
Allocosa gorontalensis (Merian, 1911) – Sulawesi
Allocosa gracilitarsis (Purcell, 1903) – South Africa
Allocosa guianensis (Caporiacco, 1947) – Guyana
Allocosa halei (Hickman, 1944) – Northern Territory
Allocosa handschini (Schenkel, 1937) – Morocco
Allocosa hasselti (L. Koch, 1877) – Queensland, South Australia
Allocosa hirsuta (Bösenberg & Lenz, 1895) – Central, East Africa
Allocosa hostilis (L. Koch, 1877) – Fiji
Allocosa hugonis (Strand, 1911) – Aru Is.
Allocosa illegalis (Strand, 1906) – Ethiopia
Allocosa ituriana (Strand, 1913) – Central Africa
Allocosa iturianella Roewer, 1959 – Kenya, Uganda
Allocosa kalaharensis (Simon, 1910) – Namibia, South Africa
Allocosa karissimbica (Strand, 1913) – Central, East Africa
Allocosa kazibana Roewer, 1959 – Congo, Rwanda, Tanzania
Allocosa kulagini (Spassky, 1941) – Tajikistan
Allocosa laetella (Strand, 1907) – Moluccas
Allocosa lawrencei (Roewer, 1951) – South Africa
Allocosa leucotricha Roewer, 1959 – Congo
Allocosa lombokensis (Strand, 1913) – Lombok
Allocosa mafensis (Lawrence, 1927) – Namibia
Allocosa mahengea Roewer, 1959 – Tanzania
Allocosa manmaka Roewer, 1960 – Afghanistan
Allocosa marindia Simó, Lise, Pompozzi & Laborda, 2017 – Brazil, Uruguay
Allocosa maroccana Roewer, 1959 – Morocco
Allocosa marshalli (Pocock, 1901) – Zimbabwe
Allocosa martinicensis (Strand, 1910) – Martinique
Allocosa marua Roewer, 1959 – Cameroon
Allocosa mascatensis (Simon, 1898) – Oman
Allocosa mexicana (Banks, 1898) – Mexico
Allocosa millica (Strand, 1906) – USA
Allocosa mirabilis (Strand, 1906) – Ethiopia
Allocosa mogadorensis (Simon, 1909) – Morocco
Allocosa mokiensis Gertsch, 1934 – USA
Allocosa molicola (Strand, 1906) – Ethiopia
Allocosa montana Roewer, 1959 – Tanzania
Allocosa morelosiana (Gertsch & Davis, 1940) – USA, Mexico
Allocosa mossambica Roewer, 1959 – Mozambique
Allocosa mossamedesa Roewer, 1959 – Angola
Allocosa mulaiki (Gertsch, 1934) – USA
Allocosa mutilata Mello-Leitão, 1937 – Brazil
Allocosa nanahuensis (Badcock, 1932) – Paraguay
Allocosa nebulosa Roewer, 1959 – Congo
Allocosa nigella (Caporiacco, 1940) – Ethiopia
Allocosa nigripes (Guy, 1966) – Morocco
Allocosa nigriventris (Guy, 1966) – Morocco
Allocosa nigrofulva (Caporiacco, 1955) – Venezuela
Allocosa noctuabunda (Montgomery, 1904) – USA, Mexico
Allocosa obscuroides (Strand, 1906) – Java, Australia
Allocosa obturata (Lawrence, 1928) – Namibia
Allocosa olivieri (Simon, 1876) – Syria, Israel
Allocosa orinus (Chamberlin, 1916) – Peru
Allocosa otavia Roewer, 1959 – Namibia
Allocosa palabunda (L. Koch, 1877) – Australia, New Caledonia
Allocosa pallideflava (Lawrence, 1936) – Namibia
Allocosa panamena Chamberlin, 1925 – Mexico to Ecuador
Allocosa paraguayensis (Roewer, 1951) – Paraguay
Allocosa pardala (Strand, 1909) – Brazil
Allocosa parva (Banks, 1894) – USA to Costa Rica
Allocosa parvivulva (Lawrence, 1927) – Namibia
Allocosa pellita Roewer, 1960 – Afghanistan
Allocosa perfecta Roewer, 1959 – Namibia
Allocosa pistia (Strand, 1913) – Central, East Africa
Allocosa plumipes Roewer, 1959 – Tanzania
Allocosa pugnatrix (Keyserling, 1877) – Central America, West Indies
Allocosa pulchella Roewer, 1959 – Namibia
Allocosa pylora Chamberlin, 1925 – USA
Allocosa quadrativulva (Caporiacco, 1955) – Venezuela
Allocosa retenta (Gertsch & Wallace, 1935) – USA
Allocosa ruwenzorensis (Strand, 1913) – East Africa
Allocosa samoana (Roewer, 1951) – Samoa
Allocosa sangtoda Roewer, 1960 – Afghanistan
Allocosa schoenlandi (Pocock, 1900) – South Africa
Allocosa schubotzi (Strand, 1913) – Rwanda
Allocosa sefrana (Schenkel, 1937) – Algeria
Allocosa senex (Mello-Leitão, 1945) – Argentina, Brazil, Uruguay
Allocosa sennaris Roewer, 1959 – Sudan
Allocosa sjostedti (Lessert, 1926) – East Africa, Rwanda
Allocosa soluta (Tullgren, 1905) – Bolivia
Allocosa sublata (Montgomery, 1902) – USA
Allocosa subparva Dondale & Redner, 1983 – USA, Mexico
Allocosa tagax (Thorell, 1897) – Myanmar
Allocosa tangana Roewer, 1959 – Tanzania
Allocosa tarentulina (Audouin, 1826) – North Africa
Allocosa tenebrosa (Thorell, 1897) – Myanmar
Allocosa testacea Roewer, 1959 – South Africa
Allocosa thieli (Dahl, 1908) – Bismarck Arch.
Allocosa tremens (O. Pickard-Cambridge, 1876) – North Africa
Allocosa tuberculipalpa (Caporiacco, 1940) – Central, East Africa
Allocosa umtalica (Purcell, 1903) – East, Southern Africa
Allocosa utahana Dondale & Redner, 1983 – USA
Allocosa venezuelica (Caporiacco, 1955) – Venezuela
Allocosa veracruzana (Gertsch & Davis, 1940) – Mexico
Allocosa wittei Roewer, 1959 – Congo
Allocosa yurae (Strand, 1908) – Peru, Chile

References

Lycosidae
Araneomorphae genera
Cosmopolitan spiders
Taxa named by Nathan Banks